The sixth series of Line of Duty, consisting of seven episodes, began broadcasting on BBC One on 21 March 2021. The story follows the actions of AC-12, led by Superintendent Ted Hastings (Adrian Dunbar) and DI Steve Arnott (Martin Compston), as they investigate DCI Joanne Davidson (Kelly Macdonald) and her team, including former AC-12 officer DI Kate Fleming (Vicky McClure).

Background, production and release 
On 5 May 2017, Line of Duty was renewed by the BBC for a fifth and sixth series. The fifth series began broadcasting on 31 March 2019, and finished on 5 May. In November 2019, it was announced that Kelly Macdonald would join the cast of the sixth series. Filming took place in Belfast, beginning in February 2020, but stopped the following month due to the COVID-19 pandemic, before resuming in September and finishing in November. The sixth series is over seven episodes rather than the usual six.

On 5 March 2021, Vicky McClure and Adrian Dunbar appeared on The Graham Norton Show to promote the sixth series, and the full-length trailer was released on 9 March. The series's initial broadcast date was brought forward because of its popularity, with some episodes still being in post-production only days before the premiere of the first episode.

The sixth series was released on DVD and Blu-ray on 31 May 2021.

Distribution 
Following Kew Media's collapse in early 2020, it was announced that ITV Studios would be handling global sales and distribution for Line of Duty's sixth series. BritBox exclusively premiered the sixth series in both the United States and Canada on 18 May 2021.

Cast

Main cast 
 Kelly Macdonald as DCI/Acting DSU Joanne Davidson
 Martin Compston as DS/DI Steve Arnott
 Vicky McClure as DI Kate Fleming
 Adrian Dunbar as Superintendent Ted Hastings
 Anna Maxwell Martin as DCS Patricia Carmichael

Supporting cast 

 Ace Bhatti as PCC Rohan Sindwhani
 Owen Teale as Chief Constable Phillip Osbourne
 Elizabeth Rider as DCC Andrea Wise
 Nigel Boyle as DSU Ian Buckells
 Christina Chong as DI Nicola Rogerson
 Perry Fitzpatrick as DS Chris Lomax
 Kwaku Fortune as DS Marks
 Shalom Brune-Franklin as DC Chloe Bishop
 Rosa Escoda as Amanda Yao, police cyber crime expert
 Anneika Rose as PS Farida Jatri
 Sherise Blackman as PS Ruby Jones
 Tara Divina as PC Lisa Patel
 Gregory Piper as PC Ryan Pilkington
 Tommy Jessop as Terry Boyle
 Andi Osho as Gail Vella
 Prasanna Puwanarajah as Nadaraja
 Sara Dylan as Boyle's solicitor
 Amy de Bhrún as Steph Corbett 
 Kerri McLean as Deborah Devereux
 Patrick Baladi as Jimmy Lakewell
 Alastair Natkiel as Lee Banks
 Maria Connolly as Alison Merchant, corrupt prison officer
 George Costigan as former CS Patrick Fairbank
 James Nesbitt as former DI Marcus Thurwell
 Steve Oram as the medical counsellor

Episodes

Notes

Reception

Audience

 Episode 1 
The BBC One premiere of the first episode of the sixth series was watched by 9.6 million viewers, a record audience for Line of Duty, surpassing its fifth series finale, which was watched by 9.1 million. It so became the best-performing drama on television in the United Kingdom since Bodyguard in 2018, also created by Jed Mercurio.

Including seven-day catch-up viewing, the series' first episode was viewed 13.4 million times.

 Episode 2
The second episode of the sixth series saw a drop in live BBC One viewers, falling 0.7 million to 8.9 million.

Including seven-day catch-up viewing, the series's second episode was viewed 12.3 million times.

 Episode 3
Episode three of the sixth series saw a further drop in BBC One viewers, with 8.6 million watching live. Including seven-day catch-up viewing, the series's second episode was viewed 12.5 million times, an increase on the second episode.

 Episode 4
The fourth episode of the sixth series was watched by 8.5 million live on BBC One.

 Episode 5
Episode five of series six drew in 9.9 million live viewers on BBC One, the most for any episode of the sixth series yet. It was also the second most-watched programme throughout the weekend of its broadcast, only behind the funeral of Prince Philip, the Duke of Edinburgh.

 Episode 6

The sixth episode of the sixth series was the most-watched television drama episode since the Doctor Who Christmas day special, The Next Doctor, in 2008, pulling in 10.9 million live viewers on BBC One on the evening of 25 April 2021. The episode topped figures posted by Bodyguard and series two of Downton Abbey, both of which secured 10.6 million viewers for their final episodes.

 Episode 7 
The final episode of the sixth series was seen live on BBC One by 12.8 million viewers, making it the most watched episode of any drama, excluding soaps, since modern records began in 2002. The finale commanded 56.2% of the British television audience on the night of its broadcast, and reached a peak of 13.1 million viewers between 21:45 and 21:50 BST, near the end of the programme.

Critical reception 

The review aggregator Rotten Tomatoes gave the series a 84% approval rating, with an average of 7.20/10, based on 25 reviews. The critical consensus reads, "Unnecessarily dense storytelling and an oversaturation of acronyms gives the sense that this sturdy procedural may be overextending itself, but Kelly Macdonald reports in for duty to provide some fresh blood and intrigue.”. On Metacritic, the series has a weighted average score of 85 out of 100 based on 5 reviews, indicating "universal acclaim”.
 Episode 1
The Guardian's Lucy Mangan gave the first episode a rating of four out of five, writing that the show "seems just as good, if not better, than ever", while Anita Singh of The Daily Telegraph gave it the same rating, stating that the episode "played to all of Line of Duty's strengths – taut, edge-of-the-seat stuff." Ed Cumming of The Independent gave it five out of five, noting that the "first episode of series six returns to what Line of Duty does best". Carol Midgley of The Times, however, criticised the series debut, describing it as "wilfully turgid".

 Episode 2
The Daily Telegraph's Singh dropped her rating for the second episode to two out of five, describing it as "exhausting" and "frustrating", while Midgley of The Times saw it as a "slight" improvement on the first episode, though still a "little dull".

 Episode 3 
Both Singh of The Daily Telegraph and Midgley of The Times awarded the third episode three out of five, with the former stating that it saw the series "heating up nicely", and the latter writing that "there was more intrigue in episode three than in the previous two combined".

 Episode 4 

The fourth episode was well received. Singh of The Daily Telegraph gave a perfect rating and described it as an "absolute belter" delivered after "three lacklustre weeks". Similarly, Louisa Mellor of Den of Geek praised the episode, and described the ambush scene as "tremendous television". In the Radio Times, David Butcher stated that the episode is "Line of Duty at its best", and Midgley of The Times awarded a rating of four out of five.

 Episode 7 
The final episode received mixed reviews. Rachel Cooke with the New Statesman said that the series "ended with a whimper, not a bang". Lucy Mangan of The Guardian gave episode seven a three out of five rating. Harry Fletcher of Metro gave the same rating. The Times' Ben Dowell gave the episode a four out of five rating, as did Singh of The Daily Telegraph, describing it as "genuine edge-of-the-seat stuff".

References

Line of Duty
2021 British television seasons